The 2020 FIM Motocross World Championship was the 64th FIM Motocross World Championship season. It had 18 events, starting at Matterley Basin on 1 March and ending at Pietramurata, Italy on 8 November. No races were held from April to July due to the COVID-19 pandemic.

Race calendar and results
The championship was planned to contested over twenty rounds in Europe, Asia and South America. A revised calendar was released on 16 October 2019. 

Eventually the season saw many changes due to the Covid-19 pandemic – after cancellations and replacements, 18 rounds took place only in Europe and half of them in Italy.

MXGP

MX2

MXGP

Entry list

Riders Championship

Manufacturers Championship

MX2

Entry list

Riders Championship

Manufacturers Championship

References

External links
Homepage

Motocross World
Motocross World Championship seasons
Impact of the COVID-19 pandemic on motorsport